Vallabhaneni is a Telugu surname. Notable people with the surname include:

Balashowry Vallabhaneni (born 1968), Indian politician
Vamsi Mohan Vallabhaneni, Indian politician

Surnames of Indian origin
Telugu-language surnames